Abu Ubaidah Youssef al-Annabi is an Algerian Islamist jihadi militant who is the current emir, or leader, of the Algerian Islamic militant group Al-Qaeda in the Islamic Maghreb (AQIM), formerly the Salafist Group for Preaching and Combat (GSPC). In November 2020, he was named emir, replacing Abdelmalek Droukdel who was killed during a French special operation during the Battle of Talahandak.

The U.S. Rewards for Justice Program is offering up to $7 million in exchange for information leading to al-Annabi's apprehension.

Biography 
Youssef al-Annabi was born in Annaba, Algeria. After studying economics at the University of Constantine, he became an active militant of the Islamic Salvation Front (FIS), an Islamist party created in 1989. A year after the end of the electoral process in January 1992, Youssef al-Annabi, freshly graduated, joined the ranks of the Islamic Salvation Army (AIS) to fight in the Algerian Civil War, then those of the GIA where he met Abdelmalek Droukdel in 1996.

He rose in rank by participating in the creation of the GSPC in 1998. In November 2009, Youssef narrowly escaped death when he fell into an ambush by the Algerian army in the maquis of Imsouhel, in the wilaya of Tizi Ouzou.

After the death of Abdelmalek Droukdel, AQIM announced on November 21, 2020 that Abu Ubaidah Youssef al-Annabi had been appointed to succeed him.

On 29 September 2015, the U.S. State Department designated al-Annabi as a Specially Designated Global Terrorist under Executive Order (E.O.) 13224.

See also
 List of fugitives from justice who disappeared

References

1969 births
Living people
People from Annaba
Algerian al-Qaeda members
Al-Qaeda leaders
Leaders of al-Qaeda in the Islamic Maghreb
Leaders of Islamic terror groups
Salafi jihadists
Fugitives wanted by Algeria
Fugitives wanted by the United States
Fugitives wanted on terrorism charges
Individuals designated as terrorists by the United States government
20th-century Algerian people
21st-century Algerian people